Agrisius is a genus of moths in the subfamily Arctiinae.

Species
 Agrisius aestivalis
 Agrisius albida
 Agrisius albula
 Agrisius bolovena
 Agrisius dubatolovi
 Agrisius excellens
 Agrisius fuliginosus
 Agrisius guttivitta
 Agrisius japonicus
 Agrisius similis
 Agrisius vernalis

References
Natural History Museum Lepidoptera generic names catalog
 , 2012: Two new species from the Agrisius guttivitta species group from Nanling Mts., Guangdong, South China (Lepidoptera, Arctiidae: Lithosiinae). Lepidoptera Science 63 (3): 116-118.
 , 1991: A study on the Chinese Agrisius Walker (Lepidoptera: Arctiidae, Lithosiinae). Acta entomologica sinica 34 (4): 470-471. (In Chinese).
 , 1997: Agrisius albula n. sp. (Arctiidae – Lithosiinae). Bulletin de la Société entomologique de Mulhouse 1997 (juillet-septembre): 33-35.
 , 2012: Deux nouveaux Agrisius orientaux (Lepidoptera, Arctiidae, Lithosiinae). Bulletin de la Société entomologique de Mulhouse 68 (3): 37-38.

Lithosiini
Moth genera